

References 

 
Ubisoft